Peter Polansky and Adil Shamasdin were the defending champions but chose not to defend their title.

Leander Paes and Purav Raja won the title after defeating James Cerretani and John-Patrick Smith 7–6(7–4), 7–6(7–4) in the final.

Seeds

Draw

References
 Main Draw
 Qualifying Draw

Knoxville Challenger - Doubles
2017 Doubles